Sanjit Bedi (8 May 1977 – 23 June 2015) was an Indian television actor. He was majorly known for playing the role of Dr. Omi Joshi in Indian television show Sanjivani. He began his career as a model, before transitioning into theatre and, eventually, into television. He died on 23 June 2015, after failing to emerge from a coma, induced by a brain ailment.

In addition to his role in Sanjivani, he also starred in such programs as Jaane Kya Baat Hui, Kyaa Hoga Nimmo Kaa and Kasautii Zindagii Kay.

Television

References

1977 births
2015 deaths
Indian male television actors
Male actors from New Delhi